Cwm-Hwnt is a tiny hamlet to the west of Rhigos and south of Cefn Rhigos in the Cynon Valley, one of the South Wales Valleys.

It is the farthest named settlement from the town of Aberdare that for postal reasons comes under that town.

The name of Cwm-Hwnt comes from the English meaning "Valley Beyond"

There was previously a through road to the geographically neighbouring villages of Cwmgwraech and Blaengwraech in The Vale of Neath which was referred to as "the Parish Road". However this road was closed in the late '90s due to the Sellar Opencast mine being dug, and the only routes to these villages are now via Cefn Rhigos and the main roads through Glyn Neath

External links 
www.geograph.co.uk : photos of Cwm-Hwnt and surrounding area

Villages in Rhondda Cynon Taf